The Restoule River is a river in Parry Sound District in Central Ontario, Canada. It rises at Commanda Lake in geographic Patterson Township at the community of Restoule. It then flows north into Restoule Lake then north into Stormy Lake at Restoule Provincial Park, at the end of Ontario Highway 534. It then heads west into geographic Hardy Township to its mouth at the French River.

From Lennon Lake in Hardy Township to the mouth, the river forms a boundary of the Dokis 9 First Nations reserve.

Tributaries
Portage Creek (left)
Burnt Lake Creek (right)

See also
List of rivers of Ontario

References

Sources

Rivers of Parry Sound District